In molecular biology, the restriction endonuclease BsobI/AvaI family of enzymes includes the AvaI and BsoBI restriction endonucleases from Anabaena variabilis and Bacillus stearothermophilus, both of which recognise the double-stranded sequence CYCGRG (where Y = T/C, and R = A/G) and cleave after C-1.

References

Protein domains